John McSweeney may refer to:

John McSweeney (Ohio politician) (1890–1969), American member of the House of Representatives from Ohio
John McSweeney (Maine politician) (1923–1995), member of the Maine House of Representatives
John M. McSweeney (1916–1979), American diplomat
John Zewizz (born 1955), né John McSweeney, American industrial music performer
John McSweeney Jr., Academy Award for Best Film Editing for the 1962 film Mutiny on the Bounty
John McSweeney (lawyer), see 1880 Democratic National Convention

See also
John MacSween (disambiguation)